The 1908 Florida gubernatorial election was held on November 3, 1908. Incumbent Governor Napoleon B. Broward was term-limited. Democratic nominee Albert W. Gilchrist was elected with 78.82% of the vote.

Democratic primary
Primary elections were held on May 19, 1908, with the Democratic runoff held on June 16, 1908.

Candidates
Jefferson B. Browne, President of the Florida Senate
Albert W. Gilchrist, former State Representative
John N. C. Stockton, former state legislator

Results

General election

Candidates
 John M. Cheney, Republican, United States Attorney for the Southern District of Florida
 Albert W. Gilchrist, Democratic
 Andrew Jackson Pettigrew, Socialist, State Representative for Manatee County.

Results

Results by county

References

Bibliography
 
 
 
 

1908
Florida
Gubernatorial
November 1908 events